Ptychadena mapacha is a species of frog in the family Ptychadenidae.
It is found in Namibia, possibly Angola, possibly Botswana, and possibly Zambia.
Its natural habitats are dry savanna and intermittent freshwater marshes.

References

Ptychadena
Taxonomy articles created by Polbot
Amphibians described in 1993